The Amsterdam regional transport authority is an administrative partnership of 14 municipalities in the province of North Holland, comprising and located around Amsterdam. It was called the City Region of Amsterdam until 31 December 2016.

Number of inhabitants per municipality

References

External links
 Amsterdam regional transport authority

Metropolitan areas of the Netherlands
Regions of North Holland
Regions of the Netherlands